Norton Pereira was a broadcaster with Radio Ceylon and subsequently the Sri Lanka Broadcasting Corporation.

He made his mark as a top class cricket commentator with the SLBC, commentating in English - he covered most of the international and national fixtures for the SLBC including schools cricket matches.

See also

Radio Ceylon
Sri Lanka Broadcasting Corporation
List of cricket commentators
 SLBC-creating new waves of history
Eighty Years of Broadcasting in Sri Lanka

External links 
 Who's Who in Sri Lanka - Norton Pereira
 Official Website of the Sri Lanka Broadcasting Corporation

Sri Lankan cricket commentators
Sri Lankan radio personalities